In mathematics and especially differential geometry, a Kähler manifold is a manifold with three mutually compatible structures: a complex structure, a Riemannian structure, and a symplectic structure. The concept was first studied by Jan Arnoldus Schouten and David van Dantzig in 1930, and then introduced by Erich Kähler in 1933. The terminology has been fixed by André Weil. Kähler geometry refers to the study of Kähler manifolds, their geometry and topology, as well as the study of structures and constructions that can be performed on Kähler manifolds, such as the existence of special connections like Hermitian Yang–Mills connections, or special metrics such as Kähler–Einstein metrics.

Every smooth complex projective variety is a Kähler manifold. Hodge theory is a central part of algebraic geometry, proved using Kähler metrics.

Definitions
Since Kähler manifolds are equipped with several compatible structures, they can be described from different points of view:

Symplectic viewpoint
A Kähler manifold is a symplectic manifold  equipped with an integrable almost-complex structure J which is compatible with the symplectic form ω, meaning that the bilinear form

on the tangent space of X at each point is symmetric and positive definite (and hence a Riemannian metric on X).

Complex viewpoint
A Kähler manifold is a complex manifold X with a Hermitian metric h whose associated 2-form ω is closed. In more detail, h gives a positive definite Hermitian form on the tangent space TX at each point of X, and the 2-form ω is defined by

for tangent vectors u and v (where i is the complex number ). For a Kähler manifold X, the Kähler form ω is a real closed (1,1)-form. A Kähler manifold can also be viewed as a Riemannian manifold, with the Riemannian metric g defined by

Equivalently, a Kähler manifold X is a Hermitian manifold of complex dimension n such that for every point p of X, there is a holomorphic coordinate chart around p in which the metric agrees with the standard metric on Cn to order 2 near p.

for all a, b in 

Since the 2-form ω is closed, it determines an element in de Rham cohomology , known as the Kähler class.

Riemannian viewpoint
A Kähler manifold is a Riemannian manifold X of even dimension 2n whose holonomy group is contained in the unitary group U(n). Equivalently, there is a complex structure J on the tangent space of X at each point (that is, a real linear map from TX to itself with ) such that J preserves the metric g (meaning that ) and J is preserved by parallel transport.

Kähler potential
A smooth real-valued function ρ on a complex manifold is called strictly plurisubharmonic if the real closed (1,1)-form

is positive, that is, a Kähler form. Here  are the Dolbeault operators. The function ρ is called a Kähler potential for ω.

Conversely, by the complex version of the Poincaré lemma, known as the local -lemma, every Kähler metric can locally be described in this way. That is, if  is a Kähler manifold, then for every point p in X there is a neighborhood U of p and a smooth real-valued function ρ on U such that . Here ρ is called a local Kähler potential for ω. There is no comparable way of describing a general Riemannian metric in terms of a single function.

Space of Kähler potentials

Whilst it is not always possible to describe a Kähler form globally using a single Kähler potential, it is possible to describe the difference of two Kähler forms this way, provided they are in the same de Rham cohomology class. This is a consequence of the -lemma from Hodge theory.

Namely, if  is a compact Kähler manifold, then the cohomology class  is called a Kähler class. In the local discussion above, one takes the local Kähler class  on an open subset , and by the Poincaré lemma any Kähler form will locally be cohomologous to zero. Thus the local Kähler  potential  is the same  for  locally.

This form is not automatically a positive form, so the space of Kähler potentials for the class  is defined as those positive cases, and is commonly denoted by :

If two Kähler potentials differ by a constant, then they define the same Kähler metric, so the space of Kähler metrics in the class  can be identified with the quotient . The space of Kähler potentials is a contractible space. In this way the space of Kähler potentials allows one to study all Kähler metrics in a given class simultaneously, and this perspective in the study of existence results for Kähler metrics.

Kähler manifolds and volume minimizers
For a compact Kähler manifold X, the volume of a closed complex subspace of X is determined by its homology class. In a sense, this means that the geometry of a complex subspace is bounded in terms of its topology. (This fails completely for real submanifolds.) Explicitly, Wirtinger's formula says that

where Y is an r-dimensional closed complex subspace and ω is the Kähler form.

A related fact is that every closed complex subspace Y of a compact Kähler manifold X is a minimal submanifold (outside its singular set). Even more: by the theory of calibrated geometry, Y minimizes volume among all (real) cycles in the same homology class.

Kähler identities 

As a consequence of the strong interaction between the smooth, complex, and Riemannian structures on a Kähler manifold, there are natural identities between the various operators on the complex differential forms of Kähler manifolds which do not hold for arbitrary complex manifolds. These identities relate the exterior derivative , the Dolbeault operators  and their adjoints, the Laplacians , and the Lefschetz operator  and its adjoint, the contraction operator . The identities form the basis of the analytical toolkit on Kähler manifolds, and combined with Hodge theory are fundamental in proving many important properties of Kähler manifolds and their cohomology. In particular the Kähler identities are critical in proving the Kodaira and Nakano vanishing theorems, the Lefschetz hyperplane theorem, Hard Lefschetz theorem, Hodge-Riemann bilinear relations, and Hodge index theorem.

The Laplacian on a Kähler manifold
On a Riemannian manifold of dimension N, the Laplacian on smooth r-forms is defined by

and two other Laplacians are defined:

If X is Kähler, the Kähler identities imply these Laplacians are all the same up to a constant:

These identities imply that on a Kähler manifold X, 

That is, a differential form  is harmonic if and only if each of its (p,q)-components is harmonic.

Further, for a compact Kähler manifold X, Hodge theory gives an interpretation of the splitting above which does not depend on the choice of Kähler metric. Namely, the cohomology  of X with complex coefficients splits as a direct sum of certain coherent sheaf cohomology groups:

The group on the left depends only on X as a topological space, while the groups on the right depend on X as a complex manifold. So this Hodge decomposition theorem connects topology and complex geometry for compact Kähler manifolds.

Let H(X) be the complex vector space , which can be identified with the space  of harmonic forms with respect to a given Kähler metric. The Hodge decomposition implies a decomposition of the Betti numbers of a compact Kähler manifold X in terms of its Hodge numbers:

The Hodge numbers of a compact Kähler manifold satisfy several identities. The Hodge symmetry  holds because the Laplacian  is a real operator, and so . The identity  can be proved using that the Hodge star operator gives an isomorphism . It also follows from Serre duality.

Topology of compact Kähler manifolds
A simple consequence of Hodge theory is that every odd Betti number b2a+1 of a compact Kähler manifold is even, by Hodge symmetry.

The "Kähler package" is a collection of further restrictions on the cohomology of compact Kähler manifolds, building on Hodge theory. The results include the Lefschetz hyperplane theorem, the hard Lefschetz theorem, and the Hodge-Riemann bilinear relations. A related result is that every compact Kähler manifold is formal in the sense of rational homotopy theory.

The question of which groups can be fundamental groups of compact Kähler manifolds, called Kähler groups, is wide open. Hodge theory gives many restrictions on the possible Kähler groups. The simplest restriction is that the abelianization of a Kähler group must have even rank, since the Betti number b1 of a compact Kähler manifold is even. (For example, the integers Z cannot be the fundamental group of a compact Kähler manifold.) Extensions of the theory such as non-abelian Hodge theory give further restrictions on which groups can be Kähler groups.

Without the Kähler condition, the situation is simple: Clifford Taubes showed that every finitely presented group arises as the fundamental group of some compact complex manifold of dimension 3. (Conversely, the fundamental group of any closed manifold is finitely presented.)

Characterizations of complex projective varieties and compact Kähler manifolds
The Kodaira embedding theorem characterizes smooth complex projective varieties among all compact Kähler manifolds. Equivalently, X is projective if and only if there is a holomorphic line bundle L on X with a hermitian metric whose curvature form ω is positive (since ω is then a Kähler form that represents the first Chern class of L in ). The Kähler form ω that satisfies these conditions (that is, Kähler form ω is an integral differential form) is also called the Hodge form, and the Kähler metric at this time is called the Hodge metric. The compact Kähler manifolds with Hodge metric are also called Hodge manifolds.

Many properties of Kähler manifolds hold in the slightly greater generality of -manifolds, that is compact complex manifolds for which the -lemma holds. In particular the Bott–Chern cohomology is an alternative to the Dolbeault cohomology of a compact complex manifolds, and they are isomorphic if and only if the manifold satisfies the -lemma, and in particular agree when the manifold is Kähler. In general the kernel of the natural map from Bott–Chern cohomology to Dolbeault cohomology contains information about the failure of the manifold to be Kähler.

Every compact complex curve is projective, but in complex dimension at least 2, there are many compact Kähler manifolds that are not projective; for example, most compact complex tori are not projective. One may ask whether every compact Kähler manifold can at least be deformed (by continuously varying the complex structure) to a smooth projective variety. Kunihiko Kodaira's work on the classification of surfaces implies that every compact Kähler manifold of complex dimension 2 can indeed be deformed to a smooth projective variety. Claire Voisin found, however, that this fails in dimensions at least 4. She constructed a compact Kähler manifold of complex dimension 4 that is not even homotopy equivalent to any smooth complex projective variety.

One can also ask for a characterization of compact Kähler manifolds among all compact complex manifolds. In complex dimension 2, Kodaira and Yum-Tong Siu showed that a compact complex surface has a Kähler metric if and only if its first Betti number is even. An alternative proof of this result which does not require the hard case-by-case study using the classification of compact complex surfaces was provided independently by Buchdahl and Lamari. Thus "Kähler" is a purely topological property for compact complex surfaces. Hironaka's example shows, however, that this fails in dimensions at least 3. In more detail, the example is a 1-parameter family of smooth compact complex 3-folds such that most fibers are Kähler (and even projective), but one fiber is not Kähler. Thus a compact Kähler manifold can be diffeomorphic to a non-Kähler complex manifold.

Kähler–Einstein manifolds

A Kähler manifold is called Kähler–Einstein if it has constant Ricci curvature. Equivalently, the Ricci curvature tensor is equal to a constant λ times the metric tensor, Ric = λg. The reference to Einstein comes from general relativity, which asserts in the absence of mass that spacetime is a 4-dimensional Lorentzian manifold with zero Ricci curvature. See the article on Einstein manifolds for more details.

It follows that a compact Kähler–Einstein manifold X must have canonical bundle KX either anti-ample, homologically trivial, or ample, depending on whether the Einstein constant λ is positive, zero, or negative. Kähler manifolds of those three types are called Fano, Calabi–Yau, or with ample canonical bundle (which implies general type), respectively. By the Kodaira embedding theorem, Fano manifolds and manifolds with ample canonical bundle are automatically projective varieties.

Shing-Tung Yau proved the Calabi conjecture: every smooth projective variety with ample canonical bundle has a Kähler–Einstein metric (with constant negative Ricci curvature), and every Calabi–Yau manifold has a Kähler–Einstein metric (with zero Ricci curvature). These results are important for the classification of algebraic varieties, with applications such as the Miyaoka–Yau inequality for varieties with ample canonical bundle and the Beauville–Bogomolov decomposition for Calabi–Yau manifolds.

By contrast, not every smooth Fano variety has a Kähler–Einstein metric (which would have constant positive Ricci curvature). However, Xiuxiong Chen, Simon Donaldson, and Song Sun proved the Yau–Tian–Donaldson conjecture: a smooth Fano variety has a Kähler–Einstein metric if and only if it is K-stable, a purely algebro-geometric condition.

In situations where there cannot exist a Kähler–Einstein metric, it is possible to study mild generalizations including constant scalar curvature Kähler metrics and extremal Kähler metrics. When a Kähler–Einstein metric can exist, these broader generalizations are automatically Kähler–Einstein.

Holomorphic sectional curvature
The deviation of a Riemannian manifold X from the standard metric on Euclidean space is measured by sectional curvature, which is a real number associated to any real 2-plane in the tangent space of X at a point. For example, the sectional curvature of the standard metric on CPn (for ) varies between 1/4 and 1. For a Hermitian manifold (for example, a Kähler manifold), the holomorphic sectional curvature means the sectional curvature restricted to complex lines in the tangent space. This behaves more simply, in that CPn has holomorphic sectional curvature equal to 1. At the other extreme, the open unit ball in Cn has a complete Kähler metric with holomorphic sectional curvature equal to −1. (With this metric, the ball is also called complex hyperbolic space.)

The holomorphic sectional curvature is intimately related to the complex geometry of the underlying complex manifold. It is an elementary consequence of the Ahlfors Schwarz lemma that if  is a Hermitian manifold with a Hermitian metric of negative holomorphic sectional curvature (bounded above by a negative constant), then it is Brody hyperbolic (i.e., every holomorphic map  is constant). If X happens to be compact, then this is equivalent to the manifold being Kobayashi hyperbolic.

On the other hand, if  is a compact Kähler manifold with a Kähler metric of positive holomorphic sectional curvature, Yang Xiaokui showed that X is rationally connected. 

A remarkable feature of complex geometry is that holomorphic sectional curvature decreases on complex submanifolds. (The same goes for a more general concept, holomorphic bisectional curvature.) For example, every complex submanifold of Cn (with the induced metric from Cn) has holomorphic sectional curvature ≤ 0.

For holomorphic maps between Hermitian manifolds, the holomorphic sectional curvature is not strong enough to control the target curvature term appearing in the Schwarz lemma second-order estimate. This motivated the consideration of the real bisectional curvature, introduced by Xiaokui Yang and Fangyang Zheng. This also appears in the work of Man-Chun Lee and Jeffrey Streets under the name complex curvature operator.

Examples
Complex space Cn with the standard Hermitian metric is a Kähler manifold.
A compact complex torus Cn/Λ  (Λ a full lattice) inherits a flat metric from the Euclidean metric on Cn, and is therefore a compact Kähler manifold.
Every Riemannian metric on an oriented 2-manifold is Kähler. (Indeed, its holonomy group is contained in the rotation group SO(2), which is equal to the unitary group U(1).) In particular, an oriented Riemannian 2-manifold is a Riemann surface in a canonical way; this is known as the existence of isothermal coordinates. Conversely, every Riemann surface is Kähler since the Kähler form of any Hermitian metric is closed for dimensional reasons.
There is a standard choice of Kähler metric on complex projective space CPn, the Fubini–Study metric. One description involves the unitary group , the group of linear automorphisms of Cn+1 that preserve the standard Hermitian form. One natural generalization of CPn is provided by the Hermitian symmetric spaces of compact type, such as Grassmannians. The natural Kähler metric on a Hermitian symmetric space of compact type has sectional curvature ≥ 0.
The induced metric on a complex submanifold of a Kähler manifold is Kähler. In particular, any Stein manifold (embedded in Cn) or smooth projective algebraic variety (embedded in CPn) is Kähler. This is a large class of examples.
The open unit ball B in Cn has a complete Kähler metric called the Bergman metric, with holomorphic sectional curvature equal to −1. A natural generalization of the ball is provided by the Hermitian symmetric spaces of noncompact type, such as the Siegel upper half space. Every Hermitian symmetric space X of noncompact type is isomorphic to a bounded domain in some Cn, and the Bergman metric of X is a complete Kähler metric with sectional curvature ≤ 0.
Every K3 surface is Kähler (by Siu).

See also
Almost complex manifold
Hyperkähler manifold
Quaternion-Kähler manifold
K-energy functional

Notes

References

External links
 

Riemannian manifolds
Algebraic geometry
Complex manifolds
Symplectic geometry